Francisco Moncion (July 6, 1918 – April 1, 1995) was a charter member of the New York City Ballet. Over the course of his long career, spanning some forty years, he created roles in major works by George Balanchine, Jerome Robbins, and others. He was also a choreographer himself and a talented amateur painter.

Early life and training
Francisco Monción was born in Concepción de la Vega, a large city in La Vega province in the center of the Dominican Republic. His family immigrated to the United States in 1922 or 1923, when he was four years old. He did not begin dance training until he was twenty, and then it was almost by accident. In 1938, he was offered a scholarship to the recently established School of American Ballet, then engaged in recruiting male students. He accepted the offer and soon found himself in technique classes with Balanchine, Pierre Vladimiroff, and Anatole Oboukoff, undergoing the strict discipline of the Russian school of classical ballet. In 1942, while still a student, he appeared in the ensemble of Balanchine's Ballet Imperial in a production by the New Opera Company at the Majestic Theater in New York. However, as World War II was raging in Europe, he postponed his thoughts of becoming a professional dancer and enlisted in the U.S. Army. After two years of military service, he was discharged, whereupon he returned to New York and began his theatrical career.

Professional career

Moncion's first engagement as a professional dancer was as a "gypsy" in a Broadway revival of The Merry Widow, Franz Lehár's famous operetta, with dances choreographed by Balanchine. When this show closed, in May 1944, he joined the marquis de Cuevas's Ballet International as a principal, creating the title roles in two major productions later that year: Edward Caton's Sebastian and Léonide Massine's Mad Tristan, a Surrealist work with spectacular designs by Salvador Dalí. Of the latter, Edwin Denby wrote, "Besides Dalí, there was one other hero Friday night, Francisco Moncion, who took the part of Tristan. He carried off the most acrobatically strenuous part without a flaw, and more than that he projected the character and the story convincingly. He is a very fine dancer indeed, and a quite exceptionally imaginative one.

Following this engagement, Moncion performed briefly with Colonel de Basil's Original Ballet Russe during the early months of the 1946/47 season. He then became an original member of Ballet Society, formed by Balanchine and Lincoln Kirstein in 1947, and later of its successor, the New York City Ballet. During the four decades that he spent in these companies, he created a number of important roles and participated in many historic performances. At the first performance of the New York City Ballet on October 11, 1948, he danced in all three ballets on the program: Concerto Barocco, Orpheus, and Symphony in C. Decades later, during the troupe's 20th anniversary season he appeared in the premier of Jacques d'Amboise's Tchaikovsky Suite No. 2 in collaboration with Robert Irving and John Serry Sr.

Roles created
This is a selected list. Choreography is by George Balanchine unless otherwise noted. Principal source of information is The Balanchine Catalogue.
 1944. Sebastian. Choreography by Edward Caton. Music by Gian Carlo Menotti. Role: Sebastian, opposite Viola Essen.
 1944. Mad Tristan. Choreography by Léonide Massine. Music by Richard Wagner. Role: Tristan.
 1946. The Four Temperaments. Music by Paul Hindemith. Role: Theme 3, with Gisella Caccialanza. This was at the first performance of Ballet Society.
 1947. Divertimento. Music by Alexei Haieff. Role: leading dancer, with Mary Ellen Moylan.
 1948. The Triumph of Bacchus and Ariadne. Ballet-Cantata. Music by Vittorio Rieti. Role: Midas.
 1948. Concerto Barocco. Music by Johann Sebastian Bach. Role: principal dancer, with Marie-Jeanne and Ruth Gilbert.

 1948. Orpheus. Ballet in Three Scenes. Music by Igor Stravinsky. Role: Dark Angel, with Nicholas Magallanes as Orpheus and Maria Tallchief as Eurydice.
 1948. Symphony in C. Music by Georges Bizet. Role: second movement, Adagio, with Tanaquil Le Clercq.
 1949. Firebird. Music by Igor Stravinsky. Role: Prince Ivan, with Maria Tallchief as the Firebird.
 1949. Jinx. Choreography by Lew Christensen. Music by Benjamin Britten. Role: principal dancer, with Janet Reed.
 1950. The Age of Anxiety. Choreography by Jerome Robbins. Music by Leonard Bernstein. Role: principal dancer, with Tanaquil Le Clercq.
 1951. La Valse. Music by Maurice Ravel. Role: Death.
 1952. Picnic at Tintagel. Choreography by Frederick Ashton, Music by Arnold Bax. Role: The Husband (King Mark), with Diana Adams as The Wife (Iseult).
 1953. Afternoon of a Faun. Choreography by Jerome Robbins. Music by Claude Debussy. Role: The Boy, with Tanaquil Le Clercq as the Girl.
 1954. Opus 34. Music by Arnold Schoenberg. Role: The First Time, with Patricia Wilde.
 1954. The Nutcracker. Classical Ballet in Two Acts, Four Scenes, and Prologue. Music by Pyotr Ilyich Tchaikovsky. Role: Coffee (Arabian Dance).
 1954. Ivesiana. Music by Charles Ives. Role: Central Park in the Dark, with Janet Reed.
 1959. Episodes. Music by Anton von Webern. Role: Ricercata, with Melissa Hayden.
 1960. The Figure in the Carpet. Ballet in Five Scenes. Music by George Frideric Handel. Role: The Duke of Grenada.
 1962. A Midsummer Night's Dream. Ballet in Two Acts and Six Scenes. Music by Felix Mendelssohn. Role: Theseus, Duke of Athens.
 1965. Don Quixote. Ballet in Three Acts. Music by Nicolas Nabokov. Role: Merlin.
 1967. Jewels, part 1, Emeralds. Music by Gabriel Fauré. Role: second lead dancer, with Mimi Paul.
 1970. In the Night. Choreography by Jerome Robbins. Music by Frédéric Chopin. Role: principal dancer, with Patricia McBride.
 1972. Pulcinella. Choreography by Balanchine and Jerome Robbins. Music by Igor Stravinsky. Role: Devil.
 1982. Noah and the Flood. Choreography by Balanchine and Jacques d'Amboise. Music by Igor Stravinsky. Role: principal dancer.

Artistic diversity
Early in his career, it became clear that Moncion would never be a true danseur noble. He lacked the elegance of bearing and refinement required for princely roles. Yet it was equally clear that he was capable of effective portrayals in many different roles as a premier danseur. He was a dashing figure in the Balanchine dances for the Broadway production of The Chocolate Soldier (1947), swirling and twirling with Mary Ellen Moylan. He was a delicately tender partner to Tanaquil Le Clercq in Jerome Robbins's meditative Afternoon of a Faun (1953), bringing a sensual, feline languor to the part. He was dramatically powerful in the title role of Balanchine's Prodigal Son, entranced by the Siren of Yvonne Mounsey and then heartbreakingly contrite as he painfully made his way home to his father. In stark contrast, he was hilariously funny as The Husband in Robbins's The Concert, smoking his cigar and flitting about the stage to butterfly music. And, of course, he was mysteriously compelling and beautiful in Orpheus, as the brooding Dark Angel, the role for which he is perhaps best remembered.

Choreographies

In the 1950s and 1960s, Moncion experimented with choreographing works of his own. He made four for the New York City Ballet and two for other companies.

 1955. Jeux d'Enfants. A collaborative work with Balanchine and Barbara Millberg. Music by Georges Bizet.
 1957. Pastorale. Music by Charles Turner.
 1959. Choros No. 7. Music by Heitor Villa-Lobos.
 1960. Les Biches. Music by Francis Poulenc.
 1965. Honegger Concertino. Music by Arthur Honegger. Created for the Pennsylvania Ballet.
 1966. Night Song. Music by Harold Shapero. Created for the Washington Ballet.

Personal life
Moncion's surname is well known in the Dominican Republic, as his family is connected to General Benito Monción (1826–1898), an army officer of French descent who fought in the Dominican Restoration War. Moncion's forebears certainly included Hispanics as well as French and likely black Africans as well. Most Dominicans are of mixed ethnic and racial backgrounds. In 1947, Francisco Moncion became a citizen of the United States, where he was considered a Caribbean Latino for the rest of his life.

After his retirement from the stage in 1983, Moncion spent his leisure years at his home in Woodstock, New York, indulging his considerable talent for oil painting. His works were shown in several New York exhibitions. He died of cancer at his home at the age of 76.

See also
 New York City Ballet
 Maria Tallchief
 Tanaquil Le Clercq
 Nicholas Magallanes

References

External links
 The New York Public Library Digital Collections – Francisco Moncion photographed in performance
 GettyImages – Francisco Moncion photographed in performance 
 The New York City Public Library Digital Collections - Jerome Robbins Dance Archive - Video recordings of Francisco Moncion in performance.
 Alexanderstreet.com – Video sample of Francisco Moncion and Pearl Lang performing Black Marigolds (Pearl Lang,1962)

1918 births
1995 deaths
New York City Ballet principal dancers
American male ballet dancers
LGBT dancers
New York City Ballet dancers
Dominican Republic emigrants to the United States
Dominican Republic LGBT people
20th-century American ballet dancers